The streak-fronted thornbird (Phacellodomus striaticeps) is a species of bird in the family Furnariidae. It is found in the eastern half of the Puna grassland. Its natural habitats are subtropical or tropical moist montane forests and subtropical or tropical high-altitude shrubland.

References

streak-fronted thornbird
Birds of the Puna grassland
streak-fronted thornbird
Taxonomy articles created by Polbot